Veronika Mayerhofer (born 10 July 1992) is an Austrian cross-country skier. She competed at the FIS Nordic World Ski Championships 2013 in Val di Fiemme. She competed at the 2014 Winter Olympics in Sochi, in 10 kilometre classical, and was part of the Austrian team that placed thirteenth in the relay.

Cross-country skiing results
All results are sourced from the International Ski Federation (FIS).

Olympic Games

World Cup

Season standings

References

External links

1992 births
Living people
Cross-country skiers at the 2014 Winter Olympics
Austrian female cross-country skiers
Olympic cross-country skiers of Austria
21st-century Austrian women